Margaret I may refer to:

 Margaret I, Countess of Flanders (died 1194)
 Margaret I of Scotland (1283–1290), usually known as the Maid of Norway 
 Margaret I, Countess of Holland (1311–1356), Countess of Hainaut and Countess of Holland
 Margaret I, Countess of Burgundy (1310–1382), daughter of Philip V, Countess Palatine of Burgundy, Countess of Artois, countess-consort of Flanders, Nevers & Rethel
 Margaret I of Denmark (1353–1412), Queen of Denmark, Norway and Sweden (also later Regent of Sweden), and founder of the Kalmar Union